Cambala Investigation Agency (or CIA for short) is a television series broadcast on Indian television station Pogo TV. The C.I.A. consists of five children who live in a fictitious town called Cambala and solve numerous crimes. Each of the five kids also has his or her own special talent. They generally solve cases before the town's police inspector, D. L. K.

Cast
 Aditya Kapadia as Ishaan Mehra
 Aditya Singh Rajput as Rohit Ghosh 
 Amin Gazi as Farhan Siddiqui
 Freishia Bomanbehram as Sucheta Duggar
 Sheena Bajaj as Nikki Mehra (season 1)
 Jasmine Alaap Singh as Nikki Mehra (season 2)
 Atul Parchure as Inspector D.L. Kulkarni "DLK"

References

External links
Official Cambala Investigation Agency Website

Indian children's television series
Detective television series
Police procedural television series
Indian crime television series
Pogo (TV channel) original programming
2007 Indian television series debuts
2009 Indian television series endings